Uranie Alphonsine Colin-Libour (19 September 1831 – 1916) was a French painter.

Colin-Libour was born in Paris and became a pupil of François Bonvin, Charles Louis Lucien Muller, and François Rude. She exhibited at Chicago World Exposition in 1893.

Her painting Charity was included in the 1905 book Women Painters of the World.

References 

Uranie Alphonsine Colin-Libour on artnet

1831 births
1916 deaths
Painters from Paris
19th-century French painters
French women painters
19th-century French women artists
20th-century French painters
20th-century French women artists